JDS Minegumo (DD-116) was the lead ship of Minegumo-class destroyers.

Construction and career
Minegumo was laid down at Mitsui Engineering & Shipbuilding Tamano Shipyard on 14 March 1967 and launched on 16 August 1967. She was commissioned on 31 August 1968.

Special refurbishment work was carried out between November 24, 1981 and May 12, 1982, the DASH QH-50D on the rear deck was removed, and an ASROC launcher was installed.

On March 27, 1982, the 22nd Escort Fleet was reorganized under the 2nd Escort Group.

On March 19, 1986, the 22nd Escort Corps was reorganized under the Kure District Force.

Around 8:30 am on June 11, 1995, a fire broke out in the machine room during a test voyage at the Kii Channel, killing one crew member and injuring two.

On August 1, the same year, the type was changed to a training ship, and the ship registration number was changed to TV-3509. Transferred to Training Squadron 1st Training Squadron.

Removed from the register on March 18, 1999. The total cruising distance was 674,753.1 nautical miles.

Citations

References 

1967 ships
Minegumo-class destroyers
Ships built by Mitsui Engineering and Shipbuilding